The New York State Democratic Committee is the affiliate of the Democratic Party in the U.S. state of New York. Its headquarters are in Manhattan, and it has an office in Albany. It is currently the dominant party in the state, controlling the majority of New York's U.S. House seats, both U.S. Senate seats, both houses of the state legislature, and the governorship.

History
The three Democratic presidents who were from New York are Franklin D. Roosevelt (32nd) who was the governor of New York from 1929 to 1932, Grover Cleveland (22nd and 24th) who was the governor from 1883 to 1885, and Martin Van Buren (eighth) who was the governor in 1829. Van Buren is also the only Democratic vice president who was from New York.

In the early 20th century when New York was without a Democratic governor, county leaders controlled nominations and campaign finances. President John F. Kennedy got involved in the early 1960s, funneling federal patronage through New York City mayor Robert F. Wagner Jr. to the detriment of state chair Michael H. Prendergast.

In 1974, Democrats benefited from Republican problems stemming from the Watergate scandal, winning control of the New York State Assembly and electing a governor, Hugh Carey. Democrats have controlled the Assembly ever since. Republicans controlled the State Senate for some years after that, but Democrats gained a decisive advantage in the chamber in 2018 and 2020.

In August 2021, Jay Jacobs of the committee was the one to tell Andrew Cuomo to resign as New York governor over reports of sexual harassment, then supported Cuomo's successor Kathy Hochul. As of 2022, the NY Democratic Party was described as having "dominance" in New York politics, as it largely controlled political positions in Albany, and Republicans had not won statewide since 2002. As of August 2022 the chair of the committee was Jay S. Jacobs. He was reelected chairman in September 2022. The Executive Committee is chaired by former New York City Council Speaker Christine Quinn. The Executive Director is Alexander Wang.

Current elected officials
The following is a list of elected statewide and federal Democratic officeholders:

Members of Congress
Democrats hold 15 of New York's 26 seats in the U.S. House of Representatives and both of New York's seats in the U.S. Senate.

U.S. Senate
Democrats have controlled both of New York's seats in the U.S. Senate since 1998:

U.S. House of Representatives
 NY-05: Gregory Meeks
 NY-06: Grace Meng
 NY-07: Nydia Velázquez
 NY-08: Hakeem Jeffries
 NY-09:  Yvette Clarke
 NY-10: Dan Goldman
 NY-12: Jerry Nadler
 NY-13: Adriano Espaillat
 NY-14: Alexandria Ocasio-Cortez
 NY-15: Ritchie Torres
 NY-16: Jamaal Bowman
 NY-19: Pat Ryan
 NY-20: Paul Tonko
 NY-25: Joseph Morelle
 NY-26: Brian Higgins

Statewide officials
NYS Democrats control all four of the elected statewide offices and NYS Cabinet and Departmental Head positions (e.g., New York State Department of Health, NYS Secretary of State, NYS Department of Corrections, New York State Office of People with Intellectual and Developmental Disabilities, NYS Department of Environmental Conservation, NYS Office of General Services, NYS Department of Education) and the Governor's Office.

State legislative leaders
 Temporary President/Majority Leader of the Senate: Andrea Stewart-Cousins
Deputy Senate Majority Leader: Michael Gianaris
Vice Senate President Pro Tempore: Neil Breslin
Senior Senate Assistant Majority Leader: Antonio Delegado
Chair of Majority Program Development Committee: Tim Kennedy
Chair of the Majority Conference: Jose Serrano
Senate Assistant Majority Leader on Conference Operations: Brad Hoylman,
Senate Assistant Majority Leader on House Operations: Gustavo Rivera
Senate Majority Whip: Kevin Parker,
Senate Majority Conference Vice-Chair: Toby Ann Stavisky,
Senate Majority Conference Secretary: Velmanette Montgomery,
Senate Majority Deputy Whip: Joseph Addabbo,
Senate Majority Assistant Whip: John Liu
Chair of the Senate  Majority Steering Committee: Roxanne Persaud
Senate Liaison to the Executive Branch: Todd Kaminsky
Deputy Senate Majority Leader for State/Federal Relations: Leroy Comrie
Deputy Senate Majority Leader for Senate/Assembly Relations: Shelley Mayer,
Assistant Senate Majority Leader on Intergovernmental Affairs: Monica Martinez, 
 Speaker of the Assembly: Carl Heastie
Speaker Pro Tempore of the Assembly: Jeffrion L. Aubry
House Majority Leader: Crystal Peoples-Stokes

Mayoral offices
As of 2019, Democrats control the mayor's offices in nine of New York's ten largest cities: 
New York City (1): Eric Adams
Buffalo (2): Byron Brown
Rochester (3): Malik Evans
Yonkers (4): Mike Spano
Albany (6): Kathy Sheehan
New Rochelle (7): Noam Bramson
Mount Vernon (8): Shawyn Patterson Howard
Schenectady (9): Gary McCarthy
Utica (10): Robert M. Palmieri

List of chairpersons

Executive Committee Chair, Christine Quinn
Christine Callaghan Quinn (born July 25, 1966) is an American politician. A member of the Democratic Party, she formerly served as the Speaker of the New York City Council. The third person to hold this office, she is the first female and first openly gay speaker.[3][4] As City Council speaker, Quinn was New York City's third most powerful public servant, behind the mayor and public advocate. She ran to succeed Michael Bloomberg as the city's mayor in the 2013 mayoral election, but she came in third in the Democratic primary.

See also 

 Independent Democratic Conference
 New York Republican State Committee

References

Further reading
Paterson, David "Black, Blind, & In Charge: A Story of Visionary Leadership and Overcoming Adversity."Skyhorse Publishing. New York, New York, 2020

External links 
 New York State Democratic Committee
 New York High School Democrats
 New York State College Democrats

 
Democratic Party (United States) by state
Political parties in New York (state)